Hwandan Gogi (Hangul: 환단고기; Hanja: 桓檀古記), also called Handan Gogi, is a compilation of texts on ancient Korean history. It is a bound volume of four supposedly historical records: Samseonggi, Dangun Segi, Bukbuyeogi, and Taebaek Ilsa.

According to its introduction, the text was compiled in 1911 by Gye Yeon-su (계연수, 桂延壽; died 1920) and supervised by Yi Gi (이기, 李沂; 1848–1909). The entire set of texts, of which the only extant version is a modern transcription by Yi Yu-rip published in 1979, is widely regarded as a forgery among academics.

Contents 
The four books comprising the Hwandan Gogi are:
Samseonggi (two volumes), describing an ancient kingdom called Hwan-guk that lasted for 3301 years, and Hwanung's 1565-year rule of Baedalguk (倍達國).
Dangun Segi (Hangul: 단군세기; Hanja: 檀君世紀), chronicling the history of Gojoseon through 47 generations of Dangun rulers.
Bukbuyeogi, describing the six kings of Bukbuyeo (North Buyeo).
Taebaek Ilsa, describing the histories of Hwan-guk, Baedalguk, Samjoseon, Goguryeo, Balhae, and Goryeo; also includes the text of Cheonbu-gyeong.

Dispute regarding authenticity

Support
Some historians view the Hwandan Gogi as worthy of further scholarly scrutiny, believing that it is at least partly based on historically valuable, ancient (if not literally accurate) texts.
 The astronomical record alleging five stars had been arranged in a straight line in 1733 BCE (오성취루, 五星聚婁) was confirmed by Professor Park Changbeom, who published his findings in a journal. He showed that the five stars would have been arranged in straight line in 1734 BCE, under the assumption that Gojoseon had been established in 2333 BCE.
 Law professor Junhwan Go offered several reasons as to why he found Hwandan Gogi worthy of consideration.
 The territory of Gojoseon described in Hwandan Gogi corresponds to the distribution area of the mandolin-shaped dagger culture in Korea. The distribution area of mandolin shaped daggers are advocated by Yoon et al. and Yi Pyong-do.

Criticism
Most historians in South Korea, North Korea and Japan generally consider the text to have been created in recent times, because of the following reasons:
 The document contains modern phrases and concepts, for example in reference to gender equality (男女平權, 'men's and women's rights') and patriarchy (父權, 'father's rights').
 The manner in which Hwandan Gogi was first published is unclear:
 An Ham-ro and Won Dong-jung, the alleged authors of Samseonggi, never existed.
 Yi Gi could not have supervised the compilation of Hwandan Gogi in 1911, as he had already passed away in 1909.
 The contents of Cheonbu-gyeong could not have been included in Taebaek Ilsa before 1911, because the Cheonbu-gyeong was first discovered and known to the Daejonggyo in 1916.
 Gye Yeon-su, the person who is said to have compiled Hwandan Gogi, may not have existed. No reliable historical records support his existence.
 The 1911 edition (or any edition published before 1979) has never been found. Yi Yu-rip claimed that the 1911 edition was burned during the Korean War or had been lost by flood, and asserted he had "restored Hwandan Gogi through memory."

Criticisms made on a South Korean television show targeted unrealistic descriptions found in the texts, for example:
 When calculating with modern measures, Hwan-guk is said to have spanned North Pole to South Pole.
 Rulers of Baedalguk are said to have regularly lived for 120–150 years.
 Hwan-guk is said to have had intricate bureaucratic systems during the Stone Age.
 Some records in Hwandan Gogi contradict each other.

See also 
 Gyuwon Sahwa

References

 계연수(이유립 복원본), 환단고기, 한뿌리 출판사, 2005
『환단고기(桓檀古記)』에 대한 새로운 이해』, Land Portal
 정영훈(The Academy of Korean Studies 한국학중앙연구원), '환단고기' 토대로 상고사 연구 보류해야 - 검증안 된 내용 왜곡 우려, The Cheju National University Press 제주대 신문, 2004-03-31
 김정배, 한국사 권4 - 초기국가 – 고조선.부여.삼한, National Institute of Korean History 국사편찬위원회, 1997. pp. 53
 안창범(제주대 명예교수),  桓檀古記 僞書論 批判, 한국종교사연구 통권 제10호 (2002. 2)
 이도학(한양대 강사), 桓檀古記, 민족지성 9('86.11), 民族知性社
 조인성, 韓末 檀君關係史書의 再檢討 :《神檀實記》·《檀奇古史》·《桓檀古記》를 中心으로, 국사관논총 제3집, National Institute of Korean History 국사편찬위원회, 1969.10
 한영우(서울대 국사학과 교수) 외, 행촌 이암의 생애와 사상, 일지사, 2002
 이상시(변호사), 檀君實史에 관한 文獻考證, 고려원, 1990
 송호수(Baylor Univ. a professor emeritus), 韓民族의 뿌리思想, 가나출판사, 1985
 金庠基, 李海鶴의 生涯와 思想에 대하여, 李瑄根華甲紀念論叢, 1965
 전병훈, 정신철학 통편(精神哲學 通編), 1919

Pseudohistory
History books about Korea
1979 books
Dangun
Identity politics in Korea
Korean false documents